Alexander Afanasevich Stoyanov, (born 10 June 1987) is a Ukrainian ballet dancer. He is principal dancer at the Taras Shevchenko National Academic Opera and Ballet Theatre of Ukraine. He was made a People's Artist of Ukraine in 2019, and  Honored Artist of Ukraine in 2016 .

Life 
He was born in Simferopol, Crimea. He graduated from the  Kyiv State Choreographic School.

He tours with the Grand Ballet of Kviv.

References 

1987 births
Ukrainian ballet dancers
Living people
People from Simferopol